Bhairab Bahadur Singh is a Nepalese Politician and serving as the Member Of House Of Representatives (Nepal) elected from Bajhang-1, Province No. 7. He is member of the Nepal Communist Party.

References

Living people
People from Bajhang District
Nepal Communist Party (NCP) politicians
21st-century Nepalese politicians

Nepal MPs 2017–2022

Communist Party of Nepal (Unified Marxist–Leninist) politicians
1959 births